James Geoghegan (8 December 1886 – 27 March 1951) was an Irish Fianna Fáil politician, barrister and judge who served as a Judge of the Supreme Court from 1936 to 1950, Attorney General of Ireland from November 1936 to December 1936 and Minister for Justice from 1932 to 1933. He served as a Teachta Dála (TD) for the Longford–Westmeath constituency from 1930 to 1936.

Early life
Geoghegan was born in Walshestown, County Westmeath, the son of Thomas Geoghegan, a farmer, and his wife Bridget (née Carney). He was educated at CBS Mullingar.

Career
Geoghegan adopted the profession of law. He was admitted a solicitor at the age of 21 and practiced in Cavan and Monaghan. Relinquishing the solicitor side of the profession, he was called to the Bar of Ireland on 1 November 1915 and to the Bar of England in 1923. He practised successfully as Junior counsel before he was called to the Inner Bar of Ireland in 1925.

Geoghegan had been a pro-Treaty Redmondite and had joined Cumann na nGaedheal in the early 1920s. He came into contact with Fianna Fáil when he was among those advising Éamon de Valera on the payment of land annuities, and in 1930, he joined that party. He was elected to Dáil Éireann in a by-election on 13 June 1930 as a Fianna Fáil TD for the Longford–Westmeath constituency. When Fianna Fáil took office in 1932, he was appointed Minister for Justice. This was a sensitive post, coming in the first change of government since the civil war. As well as being fitted by his legal expertise, the choice of Geoghegan, with his Cumann na nGaedheal background, offered the opposition reassurance as to de Valera's intentions. He held the post for almost a year before resigning to resume his law career. One of Geoghegan's last acts before resigning was to sign the notorious order deporting James Gralton from Ireland, the only Irish citizen ever to be deported by the Irish state. The historian, Dónall Ó Drisceoil has suggested that Geoghegan position as a Knight of Saint Columbanus was why he gave into Catholic Church pressure to deport the "communist" Gralton.

Over the next few years he represented the government in a number of important legal actions.

In 1936, Geoghegan became Attorney General of Ireland, serving for less than two months. In spite of his brief tenure he assisted the government in the preparation and enactment of the External Relations Act, before being appointed a Judge of the Supreme Court on 22 December 1936. He immediately resigned his Dáil seat. Geoghegan remained on the bench of the Supreme Court until his retirement, due to ill health, in April 1950. His son, Hugh Geoghegan enjoyed the distinction in 2000 of being the first appointee to Ireland's Supreme Court to follow in his father's footsteps.

Later life and death
Geoghegan had suffered ill health for a number of years before his retirement. He died in Portobello House, Dublin on 27 March 1951.

References

 

1886 births
1951 deaths
Attorneys General of Ireland
Fianna Fáil TDs
Members of the 6th Dáil
Members of the 7th Dáil
Members of the 8th Dáil
Judges of the Supreme Court of Ireland
Ministers for Justice (Ireland)
20th-century Irish judges
Alumni of King's Inns